William Evans (1798–1877) was an English water-colour painter.

Life
Evans was born at Eton on 4 December 1798, was son of Samuel Evans, a landscape-painter originally from Flintshire, who had settled at Windsor. Samuel Evans he was selected to teach drawing to the daughters of George III, and eventually became drawing-master at Eton College. There are some views of North Wales and Windsor by him which have been engraved. He left Eton about 1818 for Droxford, Hampshire, where he died in about 1835.

William Evans was educated at Eton, and originally studied medicine, but eventually turned to art, and became a pupil of William Collins, R.A.. In 1818 Dr. Keate appointed him drawing-master at Eton in his father's place. He was elected an associate of the Old Society of Painters in Water-colours on 11 February 1828, in which year he exhibited drawings of Windsor, Eton, Thames fishermen, Barmouth, and Llanberis, and on 7 June 1830 he was elected a member of the society. He continued to be a constant contributor to their exhibitions.

He made some large drawings of the Eton "Montem", which were engraved. Evans continued to teach drawing at Eton until 1837, when his wife died, and he made up his mind to move to London. At that time the oppidans at Eton were still lodged in houses kept by ladies, known as "dames", a system which placed the boys under little or no control. It being Dr. Hawtrey's wish to place the boarding-houses under the charge of men connected with the work of the school, the Rev. Thomas Carter, the Rev. Edward Coleridge, and the Rev. George Selwyn persuaded Evans to take one of these houses and retain his former position as drawing-master. This Evans did in 1840, working with great energy.

Evans died, after some years' ill-health, at Eton on New Year's Eve, 1877. He was succeeded in the post of drawing-master to the school by his son, Samuel T. G. Evans, also a member of the Society of Painters in Water-colours, and in the management of the boarding-house by his daughter, Jane Evans.

References

1798 births
1877 deaths
English watercolourists
19th-century English painters
English male painters
People educated at Eton College
Teachers at Eton College
19th-century English educators
19th-century English male artists